iTromsø (formerly Bladet Tromsø) is a daily (save for Sunday) newspaper published in Tromsø, Norway.

History and profile
Bladet Tromsø was first published on 24 January 1898 with Erling Gjemsø as the first editor-in-chief. He was followed by Erling Steinbø in the post.

The newspaper initially supported the Liberal Party. Following the party split in 1972, it aligned with the new Liberal People's Party for a short time before declaring its support of the Conservative Party.

The newspaper was owned by the company which owns Verdens Gang from 1986 to 1992. It is now published by Mediehuset iTromsø A/S, a subsidiary of Polaris Media, which was earlier owned by the Schibsted Group. The editor-in-chief is Stig Jakobsen.

In December 2009, the newspaper changed its name to iTromsø. , it had a circulation of 9,500 copies.

Editor in chief 

1898 – 1898	Erling Gjemsø	
1898 – 1912	Erling Steinbø		  
1912 – 1916	Anders Hamre	
1916 – 1916	Sverre Melvær	
1916 – 1917	Karl Sjurseth	  
1917 – 1917	Andreas Aas	
1917 – 1917	Anders Hamre
1917 – 1961	Oscar Larsen			
1961 – 1972	Kjell Larsen		  
1961 – 1982	Sverre Larsen		  
1972 – 1974	Wiggo Jentoft	
1974 – 1980	Erlend Rian	
1980 – 1985	Einar Sørensen	  
1985 – 1985	Kjell Larsen	
1985 – 1986	Arnulf Hartviksen	
1986 – 1990	Pål Stensaas	  
1990 – 1993	Per Eliassen	            
1994 – 2007	Yngve Nilssen	 
2007 -	2009 Jonny Hansen
2009 – 2014	 Jørn Chr. Skoglund
2014 – 2015 Jonny Hansen
2015 – Stig Jakobsen

Lindberg case
Bladet Tromsø became internationally known in 1988 when they published an official report on seal hunting written by Odd F. Lindberg. The report received international attention and led to a discussion about the Norwegian seal hunt and freedom of speech. The newspaper was sued by the seal hunters and sentenced after two court rounds to pay compensation. In May 1999, the European Court of Human Rights in Strasbourg reversed the ruling of the Norwegian court, marking a change in the standards of publication.

References

External links
www.itromso.no

Daily newspapers published in Norway
Publications established in 1898
1898 establishments in Norway
Liberal Party (Norway) newspapers
Liberal People's Party (Norway, 1972) newspapers
Conservative Party (Norway) newspapers
Mass media in Tromsø